HD 16175 is a 7th magnitude G-type star with temperature about 6000 K located approximately 196 light-years away in the Andromeda constellation. This star is only visible through binoculars or better equipment; it is also 3.3 times more luminous, is 1.34 times more massive, and has a radius 1.66 times bigger than our local star.

The star HD 16175 is named Buna. The name was selected in the NameExoWorlds campaign by Ethiopia, during the 100th anniversary of the IAU. Buna is the commonly used word for coffee in Ethiopia.

Planetary system
The extrasolar planet HD 16175 b was published in the June 2009 issue of the Publications of the Astronomical Society of the Pacific.

See also
 HD 96167
 List of extrasolar planets

References

External links
 

F-type subgiants
016175
012191
Andromeda (constellation)
Planetary systems with one confirmed planet
Durchmusterung objects